Norman Robert Batey (18 October 1912 – 29 November 1998) was an English footballer who played in the Football League for Carlisle United, Preston North End, Leeds United and Southport.

References

1912 births
1988 deaths
English footballers
Carlisle United F.C. players
Preston North End F.C. players
Leeds United F.C. players
Southport F.C. players
Annfield Plain F.C. players
English Football League players
Association football defenders
FA Cup Final players